Yordan Valchev (born 20 November 1941) is a Bulgarian rower. He competed at the 1968 Summer Olympics, 1972 Summer Olympics and the 1976 Summer Olympics.

References

1941 births
Living people
Bulgarian male rowers
Olympic rowers of Bulgaria
Rowers at the 1968 Summer Olympics
Rowers at the 1972 Summer Olympics
Rowers at the 1976 Summer Olympics
People from Vidin Province